Yannis Voisard (born 26 July 1998) is a Swiss cyclist, who currently rides for UCI ProTeam .

Major results
2020
 6th Overall Giro Ciclistico d'Italia
2021
 7th Overall Giro Ciclistico d'Italia
1st Stage 9
2022
 1st  Overall Alpes Isère Tour
 5th Overall Istrian Spring Trophy

References

External links

1998 births
Living people
Swiss male cyclists